Ben Janbroers (born 9 November 1948) is a Dutch racing cyclist. He rode in the 1973 Tour de France.

References

1948 births
Living people
Dutch male cyclists
Place of birth missing (living people)